The 2017–18 Campeonato de Portugal is the fifth season of Portuguese football's renovated third-tier league, since the merging of the Segunda Divisão and Terceira Divisão in 2013, and the third season under the current Campeonato de Portugal title. A total of 80 teams compete in this division, which began on 20 August 2017 and ended on 10 June 2018.

Format
The competition format consists of two stages. In the first stage, the 80 clubs will be divided in five series of 16 teams, according to geographic criteria. In each series, teams play against each other in a home-and-away double round-robin system.

In the second stage, the five best-placed teams from each first-stage series and the best three runners-up will dispute a series of playoff matches to promote to the LigaPro. The two finalists will be promoted directly. The six bottom clubs of each series will be relegated.

Teams

Relegated from the 2016–17 LigaPro:
 Vizela
 Fafe
 Freamunde
 Olhanense

From the 2016–17 Campeonato de Portugal:

 AD Oliveirense
 Bragança
 Merelinense
 Mirandela
 Montalegre
 Pedras Salgadas
 Torcatense
 Vilaverdense
 Aliança de Gandra
 Amarante
 Camacha
 Felgueiras 1932
 Marítimo B
 Pedras Rubras
 São Martinho
 Trofense
 Cesarense
 Cinfães
 Coimbrões
 Gondomar
 Salgueiros
 Sanjoanense
 Sousense
 AD Nogueirense
 Anadia
 Gafanha
 Lusitano de Vildemoinhos
 Mortágua
 Recreio de Águeda
 Benfica de Castelo Branco
 Fátima
 Oleiros
 Operário
 Sertanense
 Sporting Ideal
 União de Leiria
 Alcanenense
 Caldas
 Lusitânia
 Mafra
 Praiense
 Torreense
 Vilafranquense
 1º de Dezembro
 Casa Pia
 Loures
 Oriental
 Sacavenense
 Sintrense
 Almancilense
 Armacenenses
 Farense
 Louletano
 Lusitano VRSA
 Moura
 Pinhalnovense

Promoted from the 2016–17 District Championships:

 Algarve FA: Moncarapachense
 Aveiro FA: Espinho
 Beja FA: Castrense
 Braga FA: Arões
 Bragança FA: Argozelo 
 Castelo Branco FA: Águias do Moradal
 Coimbra FA: Sourense
 Évora FA: Estrela de Vendas Novas
 Guarda FA: Fornos de Algodres
 Leiria FA: Marinhense
 Lisboa FA: Pêro Pinheiro
 Madeira FA: Câmara de Lobos
 Portalegre FA: Elétrico Ponte de Sôr
 Porto FA: Canelas 2010
 Santarém FA: Coruchense
 Setúbal FA: Olímpico do Montijo
 Viana do Castelo FA: Alt. Arcos Valdevez
 Vila Real FA: Mondinense
 Viseu FA: Ferreira de Aves
 Liga Meo Azores: Sporting de Guadalupe

Group stage

Serie A

Serie B

Serie C

Serie D

Serie E

Ranking of second-placed teams

Knockout stage

The 5 winners and the best 3 runners-up were qualified to the knockout stage, where the winning team and the runner-up were promoted to Segunda Liga.

Bracket

Final

References

Campeonato Nacional de Seniores seasons
3
Por